Revolutions are fundamental changes in power that take place in relatively short periods of time.

Revolutions may also refer to:

 Revolutions (Jean Michel Jarre album), a 1988 electronic album
 Revolutions (The X-Ecutioners album), a 2004 hip-hop album
 Revolutions (Blind Channel album), a 2016 rock album
 Révolutions (novel), a 2003 novel by French author J.M.G. Le Clézio
 Revolutions (podcast), a podcast series by the history podcaster Mike Duncan
 The Matrix Revolutions, a 2003 science fiction action film
 Victoria: Revolutions, the expansion pack for Victoria: An Empire Under the Sun

See also

 Revolution (disambiguation)